The Golden Voice is a short film written by Gregory Cahill. It  stars Sophea Pel as Ros Serey Sothear.

Plot
The Golden Voice is about famous Cambodian rock singer, Ros Serey Sothear, and her struggle for survival.  She finds that her voice becomes her only chance to overcome communist Pol Pot.

Cast
Sophea Pel as Ros Serey Sothear
Narin Pot as Chenda
Chai Yong as Khmer Rouge Leader
Daren Thach as Male Soldier
Theavy Van as Female Soldier

Production
The film was shot in Cambodia and in Los Angeles.

Accolades

External links

References

Cambodian short films
American short films